George William Johnson may refer to:

George William Johnson (congressman) (1869–1944), lawyer and Democratic politician, United States Representative from West Virginia
George William Johnson (politician) (1892–1973), Canadian politician
George William Johnson (writer)

See also
George Johnson (disambiguation)